Dash and Dart is a 1942 picture book by Mary and Conrad Buff. The story, told through prose and poetry, is about two deer. The book was a recipient of a 1943 Caldecott Honor for its illustrations.

References

1942 children's books
American picture books
Caldecott Honor-winning works